Gao Xiumin (28 January 1959 – 18 August 2005) was a Chinese comedy actress.

She was a regular at the CCTV New Year's Galas, and was famous in partnership with Zhao Benshan and Fan Wei. She played Ding Xiang in Chinese TV Series "Liu Laogen".

She died from heart disease in 2005.

Television

CCTV New Year's Gala

References 

1959 births
2005 deaths
Actresses from Jilin
People from Songyuan
Chinese television actresses